Defending champions Bob Bryan and Mike Bryan successfully defended their title, defeating Wayne Black and Kevin Ullyett in the final, 4–6, 7–5, 6–4, 6–2 to win the doubles tennis title at the 2004 Tennis Masters Cup.

This was the last edition of the tournament to have a final played as best-of-five-sets.

Seeds

Draw

Finals

Red group
Standings are determined by: 1. number of wins; 2. number of matches; 3. in two-players-ties, head-to-head records; 4. in three-players-ties, percentage of sets won, or of games won; 5. steering-committee decision.

Blue group
Standings are determined by: 1. number of wins; 2. number of matches; 3. in two-players-ties, head-to-head records; 4. in three-players-ties, percentage of sets won, or of games won; 5. steering-committee decision.

External links
Finals Draw
Round robin Draw (Red Group)
Round robin Draw (Blue Group)

Doubles
2004 ATP Tour